Nemzeti Sport Club or simply Nemzeti SC is a Hungarian football club from the town of, Terézváros Budapest.

History
Nemzeti SC debuted in the 1909–10 season of the Hungarian League and finished third.

Name Changes 
1906–1926: Nemzeti Sport Club
1926–1931: Nemzeti Sportkedvelők Clubja 
1931–1940: VII. ker. Nemzeti Sportkedvelők Köre 
1931: merger with Terézvárosi TC
1940–1942: Nemzeti Sport Club
1942–1945: did not operate
1945-1945: Nemzeti Sport Club
1945–1957: did not operate
1957: re-established 
1957-present: Nemzeti Sport Club

External links
 Profil

References

Football clubs in Hungary
1906 establishments in Hungary